Brownlow Cecil, 8th Earl of Exeter (4 August 1701 – 3 November 1754), known as the Honourable Brownlow Cecil from 1701 to 1722, was a British peer and Member of Parliament.

Life
Exeter was the second son of John Cecil, 6th Earl of Exeter, and Elizabeth Brownlow. He was educated at St John's College, Cambridge. He briefly represented Stamford in the House of Commons in 1722, before he succeeded his elder brother in the earldom and entered the House of Lords. Lord Exeter married Hannah Sophia Chambers, daughter of Thomas Chambers, Gent., London merchant and Governor of the Company of Copper Mines (otherwise known as the English Copper Company), on 18 July 1724, at St James, Westminster, London. He died in November 1754, aged 53, and was succeeded in his titles by his eldest son Brownlow. Lady Exeter died in 1765.

He appears also to have had a daughter, Lady Ann Cecil (d. 1785). Lady Anne (1734-1785), was the youngest child of Brownlow, 8th Earl of Exeter (1701-1754) and his wife Hannah Sophia, née Chambers, and sister of Brownlow, 9th Earl (1725-1793).

References

Notes 
 Kidd, Charles, Williamson, David (editors). Debrett's Peerage and Baronetage (1990 edition). New York: St Martin's Press, 1990, 
 
 

1701 births
1754 deaths
18th-century English nobility
Barons Burghley
Alumni of St John's College, Cambridge
Brownlow Cecil, 8th Earl of Exeter
Earls of Exeter
Members of the Parliament of Great Britain for English constituencies